Soul Dressing is the second album by the Southern soul band Booker T. & the M.G.'s, released in 1965. It was their final album with bassist Lewie Steinberg, who was replaced by Donald "Duck" Dunn.

The title track peaked at No. 95 on the Billboard Hot 100.

Critical reception
The Guardian deemed the album "a classic," writing that it was part of a run of albums that "delighted mods and still represent the epitome of subtle soulfulness."

In popular culture 
The track "Plum Nellie" was recorded by British rock band Small Faces in 1966, and released on their compilation album From the Beginning in 1967.

Track listing
All songs written by Steve Cropper, Al Jackson Jr., Booker T. Jones, and Lewie Steinberg, unless noted

Personnel

Booker T. & the M. G.'s

Booker T. Jones - piano, Hammond organ, Wurlitzer electronic piano
Steve Cropper - guitar
Lewis Steinberg - bass guitar
Al Jackson Jr. - drums

Additional personnel

Wayne Jackson - trumpet
Floyd Newman - baritone saxophone
Charles "Packy" Axton - tenor saxophone
Marvin Israel - cover design

References

Booker T. & the M.G.'s albums
1965 albums
Stax Records albums
Atlantic Records albums
Albums produced by Jim Stewart (record producer)